Laing is an unincorporated community in Kanawha County, West Virginia, United States, along Cabin Creek.

The community was named after one Mr. Laing, a mining official.

References 

Unincorporated communities in West Virginia
Unincorporated communities in Kanawha County, West Virginia
Coal towns in West Virginia